Batocera hercules is a species of beetle in the family Cerambycidae. It was described by Jean Baptiste Boisduval in 1835. It is known from Indonesia and the Philippines. The species measures between 50 and 85 millimeters.

References

Batocerini
Beetles described in 1835
Beetles of Asia